Alicorhagiidae is a family of mites belonging to the order Sarcoptiformes.

Genera:
 Alicorhagia Berlese, 1910 
 Alicorhagia Grandjean, 1939 
 Archaeacarus Kethley & Norton, 1989 
 Epistomalycus Thor, 1931 
 Stigmalychus Théron, Meyer & Ryke, 1970

References

Sarcoptiformes
Acari families